Mitteilungen der Österreichischen Geographischen Gesellschaft (English: Annals of the Austrian Geographical Society) is a peer-reviewed scientific journal covering all aspects of geography, regionally often focusing on Central and Eastern Europe and the former areas of Austria-Hungary.

Overview 
The journal was established by the Austrian Geographical Society in 1857 as Mitteilungen der k.k. Geographischen Gesellschaft in Wien (English: Annals of the Imperial-Royal Geographical Society at Vienna). It has been published annually since then. Articles are published in either English or German.

Abstracting and indexing 
The journal is abstracted and indexed in the Social Sciences Citation Index. According to the Journal Citation Reports, the journal has a 2014 impact factor of 0.269.

References

External links 
  
 Austrian Geographical Society 
  Annals of the Austrian Geographical Society - ONLINE 

Multilingual journals
English-language journals
German-language journals
Annual journals
Publications established in 1857
Geography journals
Academic journals published by learned and professional societies
1857 establishments in the Austrian Empire